The Billboard Music Award for Top Latin Song winners and nominees. Notable winners include Enrique Iglesias, Shakira, Freshly Ground, Daddy Yankee, and Nicky Jam.

Winners and nominees

See also
Billboard Latin Music Award for Hot Latin Song of the Year

References

Billboard awards
Latin music awards